The Bard, Op. 64, tone poem for orchestra written in 1913 by the Finnish composer Jean Sibelius. It was first performed in Helsinki on 27 March 1913 by the Philharmonic Society Orchestra, conducted by the composer himself, but he revised it in 1914. The new version was first performed in Helsinki on 9 January 1916, again under the baton of the composer.

In England, Adrian Boult and the BBC Symphony Orchestra recorded the tone poem in January 1936 for broadcast. The first public performance in England was given by Sir Thomas Beecham in 1938.

The tone poem itself provides a profound, yet cryptic glimpse of an elegiac, poetic world: an initial, harp-led stillness and reflection are succeeded by elemental, eruptive surges and, finally, a sense of renunciation or maybe death.

Recordings
The piece has been recorded by Adrian Boult and the London Philharmonic Orchestra; recordings available in 2017 include
Thomas Beecham and the London Philharmonic Orchestra,
Paavo Berglund and the Bournemouth Symphony Orchestra,
Colin Davis and the London Symphony Orchestra,
Alexander Gibson and the Scottish National Orchestra,
Neeme Järvi and the Gothenburg Symphony Orchestra,
Okko Kamu and the Finnish Radio Symphony Orchestra,
Okko Kamu and the Lahti Symphony Orchestra,
Sakari Oramo and the City of Birmingham Symphony Orchestra,
Petri Sakari and the Iceland Symphony Orchestra,
Vassily Sinaisky and the Moscow Philharmonic Orchestra,
John Storgårds and the Helsinki Philharmonic Orchestra,
Osmo Vänskä and the Lahti Symphony Orchestra.

References

External links 
 

Symphonic poems by Jean Sibelius
1913 compositions